Jackson Ryan Hurst (born February 17, 1979) is an American actor. He is best known for portraying Grayson Kent on the Lifetime comedy series Drop Dead Diva (2009–2014).

Early life and education
Hurst was born and raised in the Houston area of Texas as the middle of three sons, his brothers are  Colin and Michael. He attended St. Pius X High School (and during high school he played  football, soccer, basketball, and baseball) and Baylor University, where he majored in international economics and management information systems with a minor in Spanish. After college, Hurst spent a year in Mexico City working for a transport company before beginning a finance career in Houston.

Career
Hurst kept his day job in the finance industry, juggling it with acting gigs, until he was offered a role in The Mist in 2007. He appeared in episodes of the television series Inspector Mom in 2006, The Closer in 2009 and NCIS in 2010. Since 2009, Hurst has played Grayson Kent on the Lifetime original comedy series Drop Dead Diva. He also appeared in the films Have Dreams, Will Travel (2007), The Mist (2007) and Shorts (2009). In 2011, Hurst starred in his first leading role in the film A Bird of the Air.

Personal
Hurst became engaged to actress Stacy Stas in October 2013. They were married in San Juan Capistrano, California, on June 7, 2014. They have three children together: two sons born in 2015 and 2018, and a daughter born in 2020.

Filmography

Film

Television

References

Jackson Hurst Bio

External links
 
 
 

1979 births
21st-century American male actors
American male film actors
American male television actors
Baylor University alumni
Living people
Male actors from Houston